Halipeurus is a genus of insects belonging to the family Philopteridae.

The genus has almost cosmopolitan distribution.

Species

Species:

Halipeurus abnormis 
Halipeurus angusticeps 
Halipeurus atlanticus

References

Insect genera
Lice